Pauline Ester (born Sabrina Ocon; 18 December 1963, Toulouse, France) is a French singer.

Biography
Ester's album, "Le Monde est fou", certified Gold disc, met success by the general public between 1989 and 1991 thanks to the songs "Le Monde est fou", "Il fait chaud", "Une Fenêtre ouverte", and particularly "Oui, j'l'adore", which was a hit in 1990. After a second album, De l'autre côté, Pauline Ester faded into the background before making a comeback in 2006 with a best-of containing three new songs. In 2008, her hit "Oui, j'l'adore" was used in a French TV advert for Groupama.

Discography

Albums
 1990: Le Monde est fou
 1992: De l'autre côté
 2006: Best Of

Singles
 1990: "Le Monde est fou"
 1990: "Il fait chaud"
 1990: "Oui, j'l'adore" – #11 in France, Gold disc
 1991: "Une Fenêtre ouverte" – #33 in France

 1992: "Peace & Love"

References

1963 births
Living people
French women singers
Musicians from Toulouse